Lentzea nigeriaca is a bacterium from the genus Lentzea which has been isolated from soil from Abuja, Nigeria.

References

Pseudonocardiales
Bacteria described in 2013